"Pastime with Good Company", also known as "The King's Ballad" ("The Kynges Balade"), is an English folk song written by King Henry VIII in the beginning of the 16th century, shortly after his coronation. It is regarded as the most famous of his compositions, and it became a popular song in England and other European countries during the Renaissance. It is thought to have been written for Catherine of Aragon.

Historical context 

The early years of Henry VIII's reign marked a distinctive character of exuberance and extravagances in the English court, made possible by the political stability of the kingdom and wealth of the state's finances. Royal banquets and feasts were held on a continual basis, as were outdoor sports and pastimes, such as hunting, hawking, and jousting and archery tournaments. The young King himself was a skilled sportsman, excelling in horse riding, archery, wrestling and real tennis. The song was penned during this period, and presents a general praise to all these entertainments and diversions, depicting the general state of mind of leisure and unconcern that prevailed in the royal court at the time. At the same time, the text provides a moral justification for all this merriment: company is preferable to idleness; for the latter breeds vice.

The song 

As with every man of noble birth in the Renaissance era, Henry VIII was expected to master many skills, including fencing, hunting, dancing, writing poetry, singing, and playing and composing music, and was educated accordingly as a prince. Henry was considered a talented composer and poet by his contemporaries.

The song is supposed to have been played in court, along with all the other of the King's compositions. However, due to its simple and catchy melody, it became a popular tune and was soon afterwards interpreted frequently at English fairs, taverns and events. It is also believed to have been one of the favourite musical pieces of Queen Elizabeth I. The song is referred to in a number of contemporary documents and publications, attesting to its popularity, and was subject of a wide number of variants and instrumental rearrangements by different musicians in the following years. In the 1548 work The Complaynt of Scotland, the anonymous author mentions "Passetyme with gude companye," as being among the popular songs within the kingdom of Scotland in the early part of the 16th century.

The oldest known version is part of the Henry VIII Manuscript (c. 1513), a collection of 14 works of his authorship currently preserved at the British Library (BM Addl. MSS. 31,922; Addl. MSS. 5,665; MSS. Reg. Appendix 58), which are signed: "By the King's Hand". The manuscript also includes two masses, a motet, an anthem, and other songs and ballads, both vocal and instrumental.

"Pastime with Good Company" remains a favourite piece in choral repertoires, and has been recorded in many variants that include lute, recorder, trombone, percussion and flute, among other instruments. Because of its distinctive early Renaissance melody, it has also been included in different movies and documentaries based on the figure of Henry VIII and the Tudor era.

Contemporary renditions 

The song was also subject of numerous contemporary versions in recent times. Renamed as "Past Time with Good Company", it was included as the third track on Under a Violet Moon, the second album by Renaissance-inspired folk rock group Blackmore's Night. 
The song was also played by rock band Jethro Tull, and appears on the remastered CD Stormwatch and The Best of Acoustic Jethro Tull bearing the name "King Henry's Madrigal". 
The song was arranged and played by English progressive/folk rock band Gryphon, appearing on their 1973, self-titled album. Under the title Mainstream, an electronic version was arranged by Peter Howell of the BBC Radiophonic Workshop for the 1983 album The Soundhouse. The first verse of the song was used as the opening to the song "Legacy of Tudors" by symphonic metal band Serenity on their 2013 album War of Ages. 
Spanish folk band An Danzza have created their own rendering of this traditional English piece in their album "Whispers of the Forest".

Melody score 

Lyrics 

{| cellspacing="0" style="white-space: nowrap;"
| Original spelling as in MS 31922 (Early Modern English)                 || Modern English (based on MS 31922)|-
|  
|-
|-
| Paſtyme wt good Ꝯpanye
| Pastime with good company
|-
| I loue & ſchall vntyll I dye
| I love and shall until I die
|-
| gruche who luſt but none denye
| grudge who lust but none deny
|-
| ſo god be pleſyd þus leve wyll I
| so God be pleased thus live will I
|-
| for my paſtāce
| for my pastance
|-
| hūt ſyng & daūce
| hunt sing and dance
|-
| my hart is ſett
| my heart is set
|-
| all goodly ſport
| all goodly sport
|-
| for my cōfort
| for my comfort
|-
| who ſchall me let
| who shall me let
|-
|  
|  
|  
|-
| youthe muſt haue ſū daliance
| Youth must have some dalliance
|-
| off good or yll ſū paſtance.
| of good or ill some pastance
|-
| Company me thynkeſ then beſt
| Company methinks then best
|-
| all thoughtſ & fanſys to deieſt.
| all thoughts and fancies to digest.
|-
| ffor Idillnes
| for idleness
|-
| is cheff maſtres
| is chief mistress
|-
| of vices all
| of vices all
|-
| then who can ſay.
| then who can say.
|-
| but myrth and play
| but mirth and play
|-
| is beſt of all.
| is best of all.
|-
|  
|  
|  
|-
| Company wt honeſte
| Company with honesty
|-
| is vertu vices to ffle.
| is virtue vices to flee.
|-
| Company is good & ill
| Company is good and ill
|-
| but eûy man hath hys fre wyll.
| but every man has his free will.
|-
| the beſt enſew
| the best ensue
|-
| the worſt eſchew
| the worst eschew
|-
| my mynde ſchalbe.
| my mind shall be.
|-
| vertu to vſe
| virtue to use
|-

| vice to refuce
| vice to refuse
|-
| thus ſchall I vſe me.
| thus shall I use me.
|}

The '9'-like symbol in the first line in the original is a scribal abbreviation for the com of "company"; another is 'cō', as used in the ninth line.

 References 

 External links 
 The Works of Henry VIII. Includes MIDI files and other multimedia. Accessed on 27 April 2007.
 Choral Wiki, Pastime with good company (Henry VIII)''. Includes scores for different versions and MIDI files. Accessed on 27 April 2007.
 

English folk songs
Works by Henry VIII
16th-century songs